The 1971 Big League World Series took place from August 16–21 in Fort Lauderdale, Florida, United States. Cupertino, California defeated Lincolnwood, Illinois twice in the championship game.

Teams

Results

References

Big League World Series
Big League World Series